Ypsolopha rhytidota is a moth of the family Ypsolophidae. It is known from Yunnan in China.

References

Ypsolophidae
Moths of Asia